Louisiana Highway 830 is a collection of six state highways which serve Bastrop in Morehouse Parish.

Louisiana Highway 830-1 

Louisiana Highway 830-1 (LA 830-1) spans  from west to east and is known as Pleasant Drive, Van Avenue, and Harrington Avenue.  It connects LA 592 to US 425. LA 830-1 also serves as the terminus for LA 592.

Junction list

Louisiana Highway 830-2 

Louisiana Highway 830-2 (LA 830-2) spans  from south to north and is known as Shelton Road.  From the south, LA 830-2 begins at an intersection with US 425.  It ends at an at-grade crossing with the AL&M RR.

Junction list

Louisiana Highway 830-3 

Louisiana Highway 830-3 (LA 830-3) spans  from west to east and is known as Cherry Ridge Road.  From the west, LA 830-3 begins at an intersection with US 425.  It crosses LA 830-6, known as McCreight Street. It then serves as the terminus for LA 830-4, known as Cooper Lake Road. LA 830-3 ends at an intersection with US 165, US 425, and LA 2.

Junction list

Louisiana Highway 830-4 

Louisiana Highway 830-4 (LA 830-4) spans  from west to east and is known as Cooper Lake Road.  From the south, LA 830-4 begins at an intersection with US 165/US 425/LA 2.  It ends at an intersection with LA 830-3 to the east.

Junction list

Louisiana Highway 830-5 

Louisiana Highway 830-5 (LA 830-5) spans  from south to north and is known as Elm Street.  From the south, LA 830-5 begins at an intersection with LA 593.  It ends at an intersection with US 165/US 425/Louisiana Highway 2 to the north.

Junction list

Louisiana Highway 830-6 

Louisiana Highway 830-6 (LA 830-6) spans  from south to north and is known as McCreight Lane.  From the south, LA 830-6 begins at an intersection with US 165/US 425/Louisiana Highway 2. It crosses LA 830-3, known as Cherry Ridge Road, before ending at US 425.

Junction list

External links

LADOTD Official Control Section Map - District 05
Western Morehouse Parish Highway Map
Louisiana State Highway Log

0830
Transportation in Morehouse Parish, Louisiana